Denis Thomalla (born 16 August 1992) is a German professional footballer who plays as a forward for 1. FC Heidenheim.

Early and personal life
Thomalla was born in Pforzheim, Germany to a Polish family originally from Opole.

Club career
Thomalla played youth football for SV Büchenbronn and Karlsruher SC.

He started his senior career at TSG 1899 Hoffenheim where he made four appearances in the Bundesliga.

In 2013, Thomalla left Hoffenheim for RB Leipzig where played three in the 2. Bundesliga. On 1 September 2014, he was loaned out to SV Ried.

On 23 June 2015, Thomalla signed a three-year contract with Polish club Lech Poznań.

On 12 January 2016, Thomalla was loaned to 1. FC Heidenheim with the option of a permanent move. In April, Heidenheim chose to make use of the option to sign him permanently.

International career
A youth international for Germany, Thomalla is eligible for the Polish and German national teams.

Career statistics

Honours
Lech Poznań
 Polish SuperCup: 2015

References

External links

1992 births
Living people
German people of Polish descent
German footballers
Footballers from Baden-Württemberg
Association football forwards
Germany youth international footballers
Bundesliga players
2. Bundesliga players
3. Liga players
Regionalliga players
Austrian Football Bundesliga players
Ekstraklasa players
TSG 1899 Hoffenheim II players
TSG 1899 Hoffenheim players
RB Leipzig players
Karlsruher SC players
SV Ried players
Lech Poznań players
1. FC Heidenheim players
German expatriate footballers
German expatriate sportspeople in Austria
Expatriate footballers in Austria
German expatriate sportspeople in Poland
Expatriate footballers in Poland